The Darien Lake Performing Arts Center is an outdoor music venue located at Six Flags Darien Lake in Darien, New York. It opened in 1993 as a replacement for the Lakeside Amphitheater concert venue. The PAC, as it is commonly referred to, is operated by Live Nation. The amphitheater has a capacity of 21,600 (with 6,410 seats under pavilion).

See also
Live Nation

References

Performing arts centers in New York (state)
Amphitheaters in the United States
Buildings and structures in Genesee County, New York
1993 establishments in New York (state)
Six Flags Darien Lake